Gandhinagar Lok Sabha constituency is one of the 26 Lok Sabha (lower house of Indian Parliament) constituencies in Gujarat, a state in Western India. Gandhinagar is the capital of Gujarat . It is one of the most prestigious parliamentary constituencies in India, being represented by former Prime Minister Atal Bihari Vajpayee, former Deputy Prime Minister LK Advani and the current Home Minister and former BJP chief Amit Shah. The constituency was created in 1967 and its first member of parliament (MP) was Somchandbhai Solanki of the Indian National Congress (INC).

Solanki represented the Indian National Congress (Organisation) party for the next elections in 1971 and was re-elected. In the 1977 election, Purushottam Mavalankar (son of the first Speaker of the Lok Sabha, Ganesh Vasudev Mavalankar) of the Janata Party was elected. Mavalankar was defeated in the next election in 1980 by INC candidate, Amrit Mohanal Patel. I.G. Patel also of the INC was elected in 1984. Since 1989 this constituency has been a bastion of the Bharatiya Janata Party (BJP). Shankersinh Vaghela won in the 1989 election and the next election saw L. K. Advani elected in 1991. Atal Bihari Vajpayee won this seat in 1996 but chose to resign it so that he could represent Lucknow in Uttar Pradesh. This forced a by-election which was won by Vijay Patel, who defeated film actor Rajesh Khanna (INC), among other candidates. The constituency has been represented by one Prime Minister (Vajpayee), one future Chief Minister (Vaghela), and two Home Ministers in Advani and Amit Shah.

Assembly segments
As of 2019 Gandhinagar Lok Sabha constituency comprised seven Vidhan Sabha (legislative assembly) segments. These are:

Members of Parliament

^ by poll

Election results

General election 1967

General election 1971

General election 1977

General election 1980

General election 1984

General election 1989

General election 1991

General election 1996

By election 1996

General election 1998

General election 1999

General election 2004

General election 2009

]

General election 2014

General election 2019

See also
 Gandhinagar district
 List of Constituencies of the Lok Sabha

References

Lok Sabha constituencies in Gujarat
Gandhinagar district